Beinhart may be:

Larry Beinhart (fl. 1990s), American novelist and journalist
Werner – Beinhart!, a 1990 film based on the German comic books

See also 
Beinart (disambiguation)